Celebochoerus is an extinct genus of giant suid artiodactyl that existed during the Pliocene and Pleistocene in Sulawesi, Indonesia (Celebochoerus heekereni), and the middle Pleistocene of Luzon, in the Philippines (Celebochoerus cagayanensis).

It is not thought to be closely related to Babyrousa, and seems to be quite distinct from any other known suid.

It has been suggested that its extinction is correlated with the geographical expansion of anoa, babirusa and Celebes warty pig ranges.

References

Prehistoric Suidae
Pliocene mammals of Asia
Pliocene even-toed ungulates
Pleistocene mammals of Asia
Pleistocene even-toed ungulates
Extinct animals of Indonesia
Prehistoric even-toed ungulate genera